Betamethasone acetate is a synthetic glucocorticoid corticosteroid and a corticosteroid ester.  It is the 21-acetate ester of betamethasone.

References

Corticosteroid esters
Glucocorticoids
Acetate esters